Sparganothis caryae is a species of moth of the family Tortricidae. It is found in the United States, including Alabama, Arkansas, Florida, Georgia, Indiana, Kentucky, Louisiana, Maryland, Massachusetts, Michigan, Mississippi, Missouri, New Jersey, Oklahoma, Pennsylvania, South Carolina, Tennessee and Texas.

The wingspan is about 17–18 mm.

References

Moths described in 1869
Sparganothis